Beqaa can refer to two places in Lebanon:

 Beqaa Governorate, one of six major subdivisions of Lebanon
 Beqaa Valley, a valley in eastern Lebanon and its most important farming region